Mitsui (written:  lit. "three wells" or ) is a Japanese surname. Notable people with the surname include:

, Japanese singer
, Japanese swimmer
, Japanese screenwriter
, Japanese actor
, Japanese hurdler
, Japanese synchronized swimmer
, Japanese philatelist
, founder of the Mitsui conglomerate
, Japanese sailor
, Japanese politician
, Japanese poet
, Japanese model and actress

Japanese-language surnames